The Rainbow Metro Station or Noida Sector 50 is the metro station of the Noida Metro railway, in the city of Noida in India. It was opened on 25 January 2019. NMRC has decide that Noida Sector 50 metro station is to be called 'Rainbow' station & would be dedicated to the transgender community.

Entry/Exit

See also
 Noida
 Noida Agra Monorail
 List of Noida metro stations
 Delhi Metro
 New Delhi
 List of rapid transit systems
 List of metro systems
 Blue Line (Delhi Metro)
 National Capital Region (India)
 Yamuna Expressway
 Noida–Greater Noida Expressway

References

External links

 UrbanRail.Net – descriptions of all metro systems in the world, each with a schematic map showing all stations.

Noida Metro stations
Railway stations in Gautam Buddh Nagar district
Transport in Noida